Huerta de Arriba is a municipality located in the province of Burgos, Castile and León, Spain. The population in 2018 was 133 people.

In the small bar by the fountain and trough, behind the door there is a stuffed two-headed calf.

References

Municipalities in the Province of Burgos